Nyabusora (Eneo la kale la Nyabusora in Swahili ) is an archaeological site dated to the Stone Age. The site is located in Kagera Region of Tanzania.

References

Archaeological sites in Tanzania
Stone age sites
Geography of Kagera Region
National Historic Sites in Tanzania